Spodnje Konjišče is a dispersed settlement on the right bank of the Mura River in the Municipality of Apače in northeastern Slovenia, right on the border with Austria.

History
Spodnje Konjišče became a separate settlement in 1952, when the former village of Konjišče was divided into this village and neighboring Zgornje Konjišče. At the same time, the village of Konjiški Log was annexed by Spodnje Konjišče.

References

External links 
Spodnje Konjišče on Geopedia

Populated places in the Municipality of Apače